Shakur Basti railway station is a small railway station in Shakur Basti which is a residential and commercial neighborhood of the North Delhi district of Delhi. Its code is SSB. The station is part of  Delhi Suburban Railway. The station consist of four platforms. The platforms are not well sheltered. It lacks many facilities including water and sanitation.  The station complex occupies a huge area as it comprises Shakur Basti Diesel Shed, Railway Store House, Cement Siding and other complexes.

Trains 

 Punjab Mail
 Gorakhdham Express
 Delhi - Sri Ganganagar Intercity Express
 Kalindi Express
 Andaman Express
 Tripura Sundari Express
 Himsagar Express
 Kisan Express
 Navyug Express
 Avadh Assam Express
 Janta Express
 Sirsa Express

See also

 Hazrat Nizamuddin railway station
 New Delhi Railway Station
 Delhi Junction Railway station
 Anand Vihar Railway Terminal
 Sarai Rohilla Railway Station
 Delhi Metro

References

External links

Railway stations in North Delhi district
Delhi railway division